HMS Vestal was a 26-gun  sixth-rate frigate of the Royal Navy.  She was built to a design by Sir William Symonds and was launched in 1833.

On her maiden voyage she departed for the West Indies on 19 October 1833 and arrived in Barbados on 3 December of that year. In October 1835 Vestal seized the Spanish slave ship Amalia. This was to a regular part of her Caribbean duties. During 1838 and 1839 she was in Havana protecting British interests off the coast of Mexico. During the following years she visited Canada, Jamaica, the United States, Argentina and Tasmania.

On 26 August 1852, Vestal ran aground on the Hemstead Ledge, west of The Needles, Isle of Wight whilst on a voyage from Portsmouth, Hampshire to the West Indies. After throwing her guns overboard, she was refloated and taken back to Portsmouth for inspection and repair. She was decommissioned in 1860; and broken up in 1862.

References

Citations

Sources
 

 

1833 ships
Sixth-rate frigates of the Royal Navy
Ships built on the River Medway
Maritime incidents in August 1852